The Blue Jackal is a story known throughout the Indian sub-continent.

Earliest reference
The earliest reference to the Blue Jackal can be found in Panchatantra, a collection of stories which depict animals in human situations (see anthropomorphism, Talking animals in fiction). In each of the stories every animal has a "personality" and each story ends in a moral.

The story
The story of the Blue Jackal known through oral transmission doesn't vary much from one part of India to another.  Although the creature is known variously as Chandru, Neelaakanth or Neela Gidhar (literally, Blue Jackal).

The most common version is told like this:

See also

Fables
Indian literature
Panchatantra

References

External links
 https://moralkahani.in/top-10-hindi-stories-in-short-moral-stories-hindi (The Blue Jackal story in Hindi)

Traditional stories
Oral tradition
Sanskrit literature
Indian literature
Indian folklore
Fictional jackals
Indian fairy tales